Kamaleshwari Prasad Yadav better known as K.P. Yadav was the member of the Constituent Assembly of India from 1946 to 1950. He was elected as the member of Bihar Legislative Assembly in 1951 from Kishanganj, Bihar on Indian National Congress ticket.

He was again elected as the member of Bihar Legislative Assembly in 1955 from Kishanganj, Bihar.
He was one of the prominent freedom fighters from Bihar.
He founded K.P. College in Murliganj, Bihar in 1965 which was later run by his son Abhay Kumar Yadav until they donated it to Government of India in 1980.

References

1902 births
1989 deaths
People from Madhepura district
Indian National Congress politicians
Members of the Bihar Legislative Assembly